Muhamma Ramanan (Malayalam: മുഹമ്മ രമണൻ) (1942 – April 2020) was a Malayalam language children's literature writer from Kerala, India. His book named Kannan kakkayute kaushalangal (meaning: Kannan kakka's Strategies) has won the Kerala Sahitya Akademi Award for Children's Literature. He is the author of around forty books in the genres of children's literature, novels and psychology.

His children's novel Komunniyute dukham (meaning: Komunni's  Sadness) has autobiographical elements. He portrayed his home and surroundings in many of his books, such as Kannan kakkayute kaushalangal. In books like Abhiyute anweshanam (meaning: Abhi's Investigation) and Anuvum kuttichathanum (meaning: Anu and Kuttichathan), he portrayed his own children.

Personal life
Muhamma Ramanan was born Chidambaran K on February 18, 1942 in Muhamma, Alappuzha district to Velikkakath veettil Kunjikkuttan and Kalikkutty. He studied at Muhamma CMS LP School, Aryakkara Middle School, Kanichukulangara High School and Alappuzha SD College. He began his career as a last Grade employee in the Secretariat and retired from the service as a Village Officer. He has also worked as a teacher in local tuition centers. He died on April 12, 2020 in Muhamma.

Books
 Kallan Kunjappan (English meaning: Kunjappan the thief)
 Maniyan poochakk mani ketti (English meaning: Tied the bell to Maniyan cat)
 Kannan kakkayute kaushalangal (3 parts) (English meaning: Tricks of Kannan crow)
 Ashtavakran
 Choonda (English meaning: Bait)
 Gulumalu Kuttappan
 Marmmani moosa
 Abhiyute kuttanweshanam part 1- Kalavu poya pena (English meaning: Abhi's investigation- The lost pen)
 Abhiyute kuttanweshanam part 2- Kalavupoya mothiram (English meaning: Abhi's investigation- The lost ring)
 Abhiyute kuttanweshanam part 3- Anchu roopa nottu (English meaning: Abhi's investigation- 5 Ruppee)
 Anuvum kuttichatanum
 Mandan Moitheen
 Pusthakam valarthiya kutty
 Unnimonum kuruvikalum (English meaning: Unnimon and the sparrows)
 Komunniyute dukham
 Maram sancharikkunna manthram
 Kiliyudeswapnam (English meaning: Dream of a bird)
 Swaathanthrayam janmavakasham (English meaning: Freedom is birthright)
 Muthassane marakkaruth (English meaning: Don't forget grandpa)
 Kannan kakka
 Maniyan poochayum chundeliyum
 Kallanum poleesum (English meaning: Thief and the police)
 Ezham kadalinnakkare
 Kuttikalude sakhav (Book on life of P. Krishna Pillai)
 Thyagam nalkiya swarggam
 Kusruthi kakka (English meaning: Naughty crow)
 Hridayaluvaya bhootham
 Kombananayum katturumbum
 A boy's heaven (Only book in English)
 Kuttikale engane salswabhaavikalaayi valartham (English meaning: How to raise children to be good-natured)
 40 kazhinja daampathyam
 Kalavu poya camera (English meaning: Stolen camera)

Awards
 1989: Kannan kakkayude kaushalangal - Kerala Sahitya Akademi Award
 1990: Choonda-Uroob Memorial Award
 1993: Anuvum Kuttichathanum - P. Narendranath Award of Thiruvananthapuram Beam
 1996: Pusthakam valarthiya kutti - Chaitanya's Bhima Children's Literature Award
 1961: Mampazham (Story) - First prize in the story competition conducted by Mathrubhumi Weekly Balapankthi
 1968: Kallan Kunjappan - NBS Children's Prize
 2007: Abu Dhabi Sakthi Award in Children's literature category

References

1942 births
2020 deaths
Malayalam-language writers
Indian children's writers
Recipients of the Abu Dhabi Sakthi Award
Recipients of the Kerala Sahitya Akademi Award